Lashkar-e-Taiba (LeT;  ; literally Army of the Good, translated as Army of the Righteous, or Army of the Pure and alternatively spelled as Lashkar-e-Tayyiba, Lashkar-e-Toiba, Lashkar-i-Taiba, Lashkar-i-Tayyeba) is a militant Islamist organisation operating against India in Pakistan.  The organization's stated objective is to merge the whole of Kashmir with Pakistan. It was founded by Hafiz Saeed, Abdullah Azzam and several other Islamist mujahideen with funding from Osama bin Laden during the Soviet-Afghan War.

The organization is designated as a terrorist organisation by India, the United States, the United Kingdom, the European Union, Russia, Australia, and the United Nations (under the UNSC Resolution 1267 Al-Qaeda Sanctions List). Though formally banned by Pakistan, the general view of India and some Western analysts is that Pakistan's main intelligence agency continues to give LeT help and protection. The Indian government's view is that Pakistan, particularly through its intelligence agency, has both supported the group and sheltered the group's leader Hafiz Saeed;  It has been accused by India of attacking military and civilian targets in India, most notably the 2001 Indian Parliament attack, the 2008 Mumbai attacks and the 2019 Pulwama attack on Armed Forces.

Objectives
While the primary area of operations of LeT's terrorist activities is the Kashmir Valley, their professed goal is not limited to challenging India's sovereignty over Jammu and Kashmir. LeT sees the issue of Kashmir as part of a wider global struggle. The group has adopted maximalist agenda of global jihad though its operations have so far been limited to Kashmir. The group justifies its ideology on verse 2:216 of the Quran. Extrapolating from this verse, the group asserts that military jihad is a religious obligation of all Muslims and defines the many circumstances under which it must be carried out. In a pamphlet entitled "Why Are We Waging Jihad?", the group states that all of India along with many other countries were once ruled by Muslims and were Muslim lands, which is their duty to take it back from the non-Muslims. It declared United States, India, and Israel as "existential enemies of Islam". LeT believes that jihad is the duty of all Muslims and must be waged until eight objectives are met: Establishing Islam as the dominant way of life in the world, forcing disbelievers to pay jizya (a tax on non-Muslims), fighting for the weak and feeble against oppressors, exacting revenge for killed Muslims, punishing enemies for violating oaths and treaties, defending all Muslim states, and recapturing occupied Muslim territory. The group construes lands once ruled by Muslims as Muslim lands and considers it as their duty to get them back. It embraces a pan-Islamist rationale for military action.

Although it views Pakistan's ruling powers as hypocrites, it doesn't support revolutionary jihad at home because the struggle in Pakistan "is not a struggle between Islam and disbelief". The pamphlet "Why do we do Jihad?" states, "If we declare war against those who have professed Faith, we cannot do war with those who haven’t." The group instead seeks reform through dawa. It aims to bring Pakistanis to LeT's interpretation of Ahl-e-Hadith Islam and thus, transforming the society in which they live.

LeT's leaders have argued that Indian-administered Kashmir was the closest occupied land, and observed that the ratio of occupying forces to the population there was one of the highest in the world, meaning this was among the most substantial occupations of Muslim land. Thus, LeT cadres could volunteer to fight on other fronts but were obligated to fight in Indian-administered Kashmir.

The group was also said to be motivated by the 1992 demolition of the Babri Mosque by Hindu nationalists, for attacks directed against India.

In the wake of the November 2008 Mumbai attacks, investigations of computer and email accounts revealed a list of 320 locations worldwide deemed as possible targets for attack. Analysts believed that the list was a statement of intent rather than a list of locations where LeT cells had been established and were ready to strike.

In January 2009, LeT publicly declared that it would pursue a peaceful resolution in the Kashmir issue and that it did not have global jihadist aims, but the group is still believed to be active in several other spheres of anti-Indian terrorism. The disclosures of Abu Jundal, who was sent to India by the Saudi Arabian government, however, revealed that LeT is planning to revive militancy in Jammu and Kashmir and conduct major terror strikes in India.

Leadership
 Hafiz Muhammad Saeed – founder of LeT and aamir of its political arm, JuD. Shortly after the 2008 Mumbai attacks Saeed denied any links between the two groups: "No Lashkar-e-Taiba man is in Jamaat-ud-Dawa and I have never been a chief of Lashkar-e-Taiba." On 25 June 2014, the United States declared JuD an affiliate of LeT.
 Abdul Rehman Makki – living in Pakistan – second in command of LeT. He is the brother-in-law of Hafiz Muhammad Saeed. The US has offered a reward of $2 million for information leading to the location of Makki.
 Zakiur Rehman Lakhvi – released on bail from custody of Pakistan military – senior member of LeT. Named as one of the masterminds of the 2008 Mumbai attacks. On 18 December 2014 (two days after the Peshawar school attack), the Pakistani anti-terrorism court granted Lakhvi bail against payment of surety bonds worth Rs. 500,000.
 Yusuf Muzammil – senior member of LeT and named as a mastermind of the 2008 Mumbai attacks by surviving gunman Ajmal Kasab.
 Zarrar Shah – in Pakistani custody – one of LeT's primary liaisons to the ISI. A US official said that he was a "central character" in the planning behind the 2008 Mumbai attacks. Zarrar Shah has boasted to Pakistani investigators about his role in the attacks.
 Muhammad Ashraf – LeT's top financial officer. Although not directly connected to the Mumbai plot, after the attacks he was added to the UN list of people that sponsor terrorism. However, Geo TV reported that six years earlier Ashraf became seriously ill while in custody and died at Civil Hospital on 11 June 2002.
 Mahmoud Mohamed Ahmed Bahaziq – the leader of LeT in Saudi Arabia and one of its financiers. Although not directly connected to the Mumbai plot, after the attacks he was added to the UN list of people that sponsor terrorism.
 Nasr Javed – a Kashmiri senior operative, is on the list of individuals banned from entering the United Kingdom for "engaging in unacceptable behaviour by seeking to foment, justify or glorify terrorist violence in furtherance of particular beliefs."
 Abu Nasir (Srinagar commander)

History

Formation
In 1985, Hafiz Mohammed Saeed and Zafar Iqbal formed the Jamaat-ud-Dawa (Organization for Preaching, or JuD) as a small missionary group dedicated to promoting an Ahl-e-Hadith version of Islam. In the next year, Zaki-ur Rehman Lakvi merged his group of anti-Soviet jihadists with the JuD to form the Markaz-ud Dawa-wal-Irshad (Center for Preaching and Guidance, or MDI). The MDI had 17 founders originally, and notable among them was Abdullah Azzam.

The LeT was formed in Afghanistan's Kunar province in 1990 and gained prominence in the early 1990s as a military offshoot of MDI. MDI's primary concerns were dawah and the LeT focused on jihad although the members did not distinguish between the two groups' functions. According to Hafiz Saeed, "Islam propounds both dawa[h] and jihad. Both are equally important and inseparable. Since our life revolves around Islam, therefore both dawa and jihad are essential; we cannot prefer one over the other."

Most of these training camps were located in North-West Frontier Province (NWFP) and many were shifted to Pakistan Administered Kashmir for the sole purpose of training volunteers for the Kashmir Jihad. From 1991 onward, militancy surged in Indian Kashmir, as many Lashkar-e-Taiba volunteers were infiltrated into Indian Kashmir from Pakistan Administered Kashmir with the help of the Pakistan Army and ISI. As of 2010, the degree of control that Pakistani intelligence retains over LeT's operations is not known.

Designation as terrorist group
On 28 March 2001, in Statutory Instrument 2001 No. 1261, British Home Secretary Jack Straw designated the group a Proscribed Terrorist Organization under the Terrorism Act 2000.

On 5 December 2001, the group was added to the Terrorist Exclusion List. In a notification dated 26 December 2001, United States Secretary of State Colin Powell, designated Lashkar-e-Taiba a Foreign Terrorist Organization.

Lashkar-e-Taiba was banned in Pakistan on 12 January 2002.

It is banned in India as a designated terrorist group under the Unlawful Activities (Prevention) Act.

It was listed as a terrorist organization in Australia under the Security Legislation Amendment (Terrorism) Act 2002 on 11 April 2003 and was re-listed on 11 April 2005 and 31 March 2007.

On 2 May 2008, it was placed on the Consolidated List established and maintained by the committee established by the United Nations Security Council Resolution 1267 as an entity associated with al-Qaeda. The report also proscribed Jamaat-ud-Dawa as a front group of the LeT. Bruce Riedel, an expert on terrorism, believes that LeT with the support of its Pakistani backers is more dangerous than al-Qaeda.

Aftermath of Mumbai attacks
According to a media report, the US accused JuD of being the front group for the prime suspects of the November 2008 Mumbai attacks, the Lashkar-e-Taiba, the organization that trained the 10 gunmen involved in these attacks.

On 7 December 2008, under pressure from the US and India, Pakistani army launched an operation against LeT and raided a markaz (center) of the LeT at Shawai Nullah, 5 km from Muzaffarabad in Pakistan-controlled Pakistan Administered Kashmir. The army arrested more than twenty members of the LeT including Zaki-ur-Rehman Lakhvi, the alleged mastermind of the Mumbai attacks. They are said to have sealed off the center, which included a madrasah and a mosque alongside offices of the LeT according to the government of Pakistan.

On 10 December 2008, India formally requested the United Nations Security Council to designate JuD as a terrorist organization. Subsequently, Pakistan's ambassador to the United Nations Abdullah Hussain gave an undertaking, saying,

A similar assurance was given by Pakistan in 2002 when it clamped down on the LeT; however, the LeT was covertly allowed to function under the guise of the JuD. While arrests have been made, the Pakistani government has categorically refused to allow any foreign investigators access to Hafiz Muhammad Saeed.

On 11 December 2008, the United Nations Security Council imposed sanctions on JuD, declaring it a global terrorist group. Saeed, the chief of JuD, declared that his group would challenge the sanctions imposed on it in all forums. Pakistan's government also banned the JuD on the same day and issued an order to seal the JuD in all four provinces, as well as Pakistan-controlled Kashmir. Before the ban JuD, ran a weekly newspaper named Ghazwah, two monthly magazines called Majalla Tud Dawaa and Zarb e Taiba, and a fortnightly magazine for children, Nanhe Mujahid. The publications have since been banned by the Pakistani government. In addition to the prohibition of JuD's print publications, the organization's websites were also shut down by the Pakistani government.

After the UNSC ban, Hindu minority groups in Pakistan came out in support of JuD. At protest marches in Hyderabad, Hindu groups said that JuD does charity work such as setting up water wells in desert regions and providing food to the poor. However, according to the BBC, the credibility of the level of support for the protest was questionable as protesters on their way to what they believed was a rally against price rises had been handed signs in support of JuD. The JuD ban has been met with heavy criticism in many Pakistani circles, as JuD was the first to react to the Kashmir earthquake and the Ziarat earthquake. It also ran over 160 schools with thousands of students and provided aid in hospitals as well. JuD disguises terrorist activities by showing fake welfare trusts.

In January 2009, JuD spokesperson, Abdullah Muntazir, stressed that the group did not have global jihadist aspirations and would welcome a peaceful resolution of the Kashmir issue. He also publicly disowned LeT commanders Zaki-ur-Rehman Lakhvi and Zarrar Shah, who have both been accused of being the masterminds behind the Mumbai attacks.

In response to the UN resolution and the government ban, the JuD reorganized itself under the name of Tehreek-e-Tahafuz Qibla Awal (TTQA).

On 25 June 2014, the United States added several of LeT affiliates including Jamaat-ud-Dawa, Al-Anfal Trust, Tehrik-e-Hurmat-e-Rasool, and Tehrik-e-Tahafuz Qibla Awwal to the list of foreign terrorist organizations.

Milli Muslim League

Jamaat-ud-Dawa members on 7 August 2017 announced the creation of a political party called Milli Muslim League. Tabish Qayoum, a JuD activist working as the party spokesman, stated they had filed registration papers for a new party with Pakistan's electoral commission. Later in August, JuD under the banner of the party fielded a candidate for the 2017 by-election of Constituency NA-120. Muhammad Yaqoob Sheikh filed his nomination papers as an independent candidate.

The registration application of the party was rejected by ECP on the 12th of October. Hafiz Saeed announced in December, a few days after release from house arrest on 24 November, that his organization will contest the 2018 elections.

Name Changes
In February 2019, after the Pulwama attack, the Pakistan government placed the ban once again on Jamat-ud-Dawa and its charity organization Falah-e-Insaniat Foundation (FIF). To evade the ban, their names were changed to Al Madina and Aisar Foundation respectively and they continued their work as before.

The Resistance Front

The Resistance Front (TRF) was launched after the revocation of the special status of Jammu and Kashmir in 2019. Lashkar-e-Taiba leaders form the core of the TRF. TRF has taken responsibility for various attacks in Kashmir in 2020 including the deaths of five Indian Army para commandos . In June 2020, Army's XV Corps commander Lt General B S Raju said "There is no organisation called TRF. It is a social media entity which is trying to take credit for anything and everything that is happening within the Valley. It is in the electronic domain."

People’s Anti-Fascist Front

The PAFF was originally thought to be a faction of Lashkar-e-Taiba according to Indian officials. The Indian police claimed it is an offshoot of Jaish-e-Muhammad. The PAFF was created during the wake of the 2019 Kashmir Protests after the revocation of autonomy of the Jammu and Kashmir. The PAFF has claimed responsibility of many attacks in Kashmir against Indian forces.

Influence in Kashmir

After the Mujahideen victory against the Soviet Union occupation in Afghanistan, Lashkar-e-Taiba and Mujahideen fighters, with the aid of Pakistan, slowly infiltrated Kashmir with the goal of spreading a Radical Islamist Ideology to Jihad against Indian administration in Jammu and Kashmir.

Activities
The group conducts training camps and humanitarian work. Across Pakistan, the organization runs 16 Islamic institutions, 135 secondary schools, an ambulance service, mobile clinics, blood banks and seminaries according to the South Asia Terrorism Portal.

The group actively carried out attacks on Indian Armed Forces in Jammu and Kashmir.

Some breakaway Lashkar members have been accused of carrying out attacks in Pakistan, particularly in Karachi, to mark its opposition to the policies of former president Pervez Musharraf.

Publications
Christine Fair estimates that, through its editing house Dar al Andalus, "LeT is perhaps the most prolific producer of jihadi literature in Pakistan." By the end of the 90s, the Urdu monthly magazine Mujallah al-Dawah had a circulation of 100 000, another monthly magazine, Ghazwa, of 20 000, while other weekly and monthly publications target students (Zarb-e-Tayyaba), women (Tayyabaat), children and those who are literate in English (Voice of Islam and Invite) or Arabic (al-Ribat.) It also publishes, every year, around 100 booklets, in many languages. It has been described as a "profitable department, selling lacs of books every year."

Training camps
The LeT training camps are presently located at a number of locations in Pakistan. These camps, which include its base camp, Markaz-e-Taiba in Muridke near Lahore and the one near Manshera, are used to impart training to militants. In these camps, the following trainings are imparted:
 the 21-day religious course (Daura-e-Sufa)
 the 21-day basic combat course (Daura-e-Aam)
 the three-months advanced combat course (Daura-e-Khaas)
26/11 mastermind, Zabiuddin Ansari alias, Abu Jundal arrested recently by Indian intelligence agencies is reported to have disclosed that paragliding training was also included in the training curriculum of LeT cadres at is camps in Muzaffarabad.

These camps have long been tolerated since Inception by the Pakistan's powerful Inter-Services Intelligence (ISI) agency because of their usefulness against India and in Afghanistan although they have been instructed not to mount any operations for now. A French anti-terrorism expert, Jean-Louis Bruguière, in his Some Things that I Wasn’t Able to Say has stated that the regular Pakistani army officers trained the militants in the LeT training camps until recently. He reached this conclusion after interrogating a French militant, Willy Brigitte, who had been trained by the LeT and arrested in Australia in 2003.

Markaz-e-Taiba
The LeT base camp Markaz-e-Taiba is in Nangal Saday, about 5 km North of Muridke, on East side of G.T. road; about 30 km from Lahore, was established in 1988. The initial sectarian religious training, Daura-e-Sufa is imparted here to the militants.

Other training camps
In 1987, LeT established two training camps in Afghanistan. The first one was the Muaskar-e-Taiba at Jaji in Paktia Province and the second one was the Muaskar-e-Aqsa in Kunar Province. US intelligence analysts justify the extrajudicial detention of at least one Guantanamo detainee because they allege he attended a LeT training camp in Afghanistan. A memorandum summarizing the factors for and against the continued detention of Bader Al Bakri Al Samiri asserts that he attended a LeT training camp.

Mariam Abou Zahab and Olivier Roy in their Islamist Networks: The Afghan-Pakistan Connection (London: C. Hurst & Co., 2004) mentioned three training camps in Pakistan-administered Kashmir, the principal one is the Umm-al-Qura training camp at Muzaffarabad. Every month five hundred militants are trained in these camps. Muhammad Amir Rana in his A to Z of Jehadi Organizations in Pakistan (Lahore: Mashal, 2004) listed five training camps. Four of them, the Muaskar-e-Taiba, the Muaskar-e-Aqsa, the Muaskar Umm-al-Qura and the Muaskar Abdullah bin Masood are in Pakistan-administered Kashmir and the Markaz Mohammed bin Qasim training camp is in Sanghar District of Sindh. Ten thousand militants had been trained in these camps till 2004.

Funding
The government of Pakistan began to fund the LeT during the early 1990s and by around 1995 the funding had grown considerably. During this time the army and the ISI helped establish the LeT's military structure with the specific intent to use the militant group against Indians. The LeT also obtained funds through efforts of the MDI's Department of Finance.

Until 2002, the LeT collected funds through public fundraising events usually using charity boxes in shops. The group also received money through donations at MDI offices, through personal donations collected at public celebrations of an operative's martyrdom, and through its website. The LeT also collected donations from the Pakistani immigrant community in the Persian Gulf and United Kingdom, Islamic Non-Governmental Organizations, and Pakistani and Kashmiri businessmen. LeT operatives have also been apprehended in India, where they had been obtaining funds from sections of the Muslim community.

Although many of the funds collected went towards legitimate uses, e.g. factories and other businesses, a significant portion was dedicated to military activities. According to US intelligence, the LeT had a military budget of more than $5 million by 2009.

Use of charity aid to fund relief operations
LeT assisted victims after the 2005 Kashmir earthquake. In many instances, they were the first on the scene, arriving before the army or other civilians.

A large amount of funds collected among the Pakistani expatriate community in Britain to aid victims of the earthquake were funneled for the activities of LeT although the donors were unaware. About £5 million were collected, but more than half of the funds were directed towards LeT rather than towards relief efforts. Intelligence officials stated that some of the funds were used to prepare for an attack that would have detonated explosives on board transatlantic airflights. Other investigations also indicated the aid received for earthquake relief was used to increase fighter recruitment.

Notable incidents
 1998 Wandhama massacre: 23 Kashmiri pandits were murdered on 25 January 1998.
 In March 2000, Lashkar-e-Taiba militants are claimed to have been involved in the Chittisinghpura massacre, where 35 Sikhs in the town of Chittisinghpura in Kashmir were killed. An 18-year-old male, who was arrested in December of that year, admitted in an interview with a New York Times correspondent to the involvement of the group and expressed no regret in perpetrating the anti-Sikh massacre. In a separate interview with the same correspondent, Hafiz Muhammad Saeed denied knowing the young man and dismissed any possible involvement of LeT. In 2010, the Lashkar-e-Taiba (LeT) associate David Headley, who was arrested in connection with the 2008 Mumbai attacks, reportedly confessed to the National Investigation Agency that the LeT carried out the Chittisinghpura massacre. He is said to have identified an LeT militant named Muzzamil as part of the group which carried out the killings apparently to create communal tension just before Clinton's visit.
 The LeT was also held responsible by the government for the 2000 terrorist attack on Red Fort, New Delhi. LeT confirmed its participation in the Red Fort attack.
 LeT claimed responsibility for an attack on the Srinagar Airport that left five Indians and six militants dead.
 The group claimed responsibility for an attack on Indian security forces along the border.
 The Indian government blamed LeT, in coordination with Jaish-e-Mohammed, for a 13 December 2001 assault on parliament in Delhi.
 2002 Kaluchak massacre 31 killed 14 May 2002. Australian government attributed this massacre to Lashkar-e-Taiba when it designated it as a terrorist organization.
 2003 Nadimarg Massacre 24 Kashmiri pandits gunned down on the night of 23 March 2003.
 2005 Delhi bombings: During Diwali, Lashkar-e-Taiba bombed crowded festive Delhi markets killing 60 civilians and maiming 527. It claimed the attack under the pseudonym of "Islami Inqilabi Mahaz" (Islamic Revolutionary Front) on a jihadist website.
 2006 Varanasi bombings: Lashkar-e-Taiba was involved in serial blasts in Varanasi in the state of Uttar Pradesh. 37 people died and 89 were seriously injured.
 2006 Doda massacre 34 Hindus were killed in Kashmir on 30 April 2006.
 2006 Mumbai train bombings: The investigation launched by Indian forces and US officials have pointed to the involvement of Lashkar-e-Taiba in Mumbai serial blasts on 11 July 2006. The Mumbai serial blasts on 11 July claimed 211 lives and maimed about 407 people and seriously injured another 768.
 On 12 September 2006 the propaganda arm of the Lashkar-e-Taiba issued a fatwa against Pope Benedict XVI demanding that Muslims assassinate him for his controversial statements about Muhammad.
 On 16 September 2006, a top Lashkar-e-Taiba militant, Abu Saad, was killed by the troops of 9-Rashtriya Rifles in Nandi Marg forest in Kulgam. Saad belongs to Lahore in Pakistan and also oversaw LeT operations for the past three years in Gul Gulabhgash as the outfit's area commander. Apart from a large quantity of arms and ammunition, high denomination Indian and Pakistani currencies were also recovered from the slain militant.
 2008 Mumbai attacks In November 2008, Lashkar-e-Taiba was the primary suspect behind the Mumbai attacks but denied any part. The lone surviving gunman, Ajmal Amir Kasab, captured by Indian authorities admitted the attacks were planned and executed by the organization. United States intelligence sources confirmed that their evidence suggested Lashkar-e-Taiba is behind the attacks. A July 2009 report from Pakistani investigators confirmed that LeT was behind the attack.
 On 7 December 2008, under pressure from USA and India, the Pakistan Army launched an operation against LeT and Jamat-ud-Dawa to arrest people suspected of 26/11 Mumbai attacks.
 In August 2009, LeT issued an ultimatum to impose Islamic dress code in all colleges in Jammu and Kashmir, sparking fresh fears in the tense region.
 In September and October 2009, Israeli and Indian intelligence agencies issued alerts warning that LeT was planning to attack Jewish religious places in Pune, India and other locations visited by Western and Israeli tourists in India. The gunmen who attacked the Mumbai headquarters of the Chabad Lubavitch movement during the November 2008 attacks were reportedly instructed that, "Every person you kill where you are is worth 50 of the ones killed elsewhere."
 News sources have reported that members of LeT were planning to attack the U.S. and Indian embassies in Dhaka, Bangladesh, on 26 November 2009, to coincide with the one-year anniversary of the November 2008 Mumbai attacks. At least seven men were arrested in connection to the plot, including a senior member of LeT.
 Two Chicago residents, David Coleman Headley and Tahawwur Hussain Rana, were allegedly working with LeT in planning an attack against the offices and employees of Jyllands-Posten, a Danish newspaper that published controversial cartoons of Muhammad. Indian news sources also implicated the men in the November 2008 Mumbai attacks and in LeT's Fall 2009 plans to attack the U.S. and Indian embassies in Bangladesh.

Losing of LeT Group Heads
Abrar, Intelligence Chief of LeT in Afghanistan was arrested and 8 other militants were killed by NDS in Nangarhar Province.
Abu Dujana, Chief of Lashkar-e-taiba in Kashmir Valley was killed by Indian security forces on 2 August 2017.
Abu Qasim, operations commander of the terrorist group, was killed in a joint operation by the Indian army and the special operations group of the Jammu and Kashmir police on 30 October 2015.
Junaid Mattoo, Lashkar-e-Taiba commander for Kulgam was killed in an encounter with security forces in Arvani.
Waseem Shah, responsible for recruiting fresh cadres and involved in many attacks on security forces in south Kashmir was killed on 14 October 2017.
 Six top LeT commanders including Owaid, son of Abdul Rehman Makki and nephew of Zaki-ur-Rehman Lakhvi, wanted commanders Zargam and Mehmood, were killed on 18 November 2017. Mehmood was responsible for killing a constable on 27 September and two Garud commandos on 11 October.

External relationships

Support from Saudi Arabia
According to a secret December 2009 paper signed by the US secretary of state, "Saudi Arabia remains a critical financial support base for al-Qaeda, the Taliban, LeT and other terrorist groups." LeT used a Saudi-based front company to fund its activities in 2005.

Role in India-Pakistan relations
LeT attacks have increased tensions in the already contentious relationship between India and Pakistan. Part of the LeT strategy may be to deflect the attention of Pakistan's military away from the tribal areas and towards its border with India. Attacks in India also aim to exacerbate tensions between India's Hindu and Muslim communities and help LeT recruitment strategies in India.

LeT cadres have also been arrested in different cities of India. On 27 May, a LeT militant was arrested from Hajipur in Gujarat. On 15 August 2001, a LeT militant was arrested from Bhatinda in Punjab. Mumbai police's interrogation of LeT operative, Abu Jundal revealed that LeT has planned 10 more terror attacks across India and he had agreed to participate in these attacks. A top US counter-terrorism official, Daniel Benjamin, in a news conference on 31 July 2012, told that LeT was a threat to the stability in South Asia urging Pakistan to take strong action against the terror outfit. Interrogation of Jundal revealed that LeT was planning to carry out aerial attacks on Indian cities and had trained 150 paragliders for this. He knew of these plans when he visited a huge bungalow in eastern Karachi where top LeT men, supervised by a man called Yakub were planning aerial and sea route attacks on India.

Inter-Services Intelligence involvement
The ISI have provided financial and material support to LeT. In 2010, Interpol issued warrants for the arrest of two serving officers in the Pakistan Army for alleged involvement in the 2008 Mumbai attacks. The LeT was also reported to have been directed by the ISI to widen its network in the Jammu region where a considerable section of the populace comprised Punjabis. The LeT has a large number of activists who hail from Indian Punjab and can thus effectively penetrate into Jammu society. A 13 December 2001 news report cited a LeT spokesperson as saying that LeT wanted to avoid a clash with the Pakistani government. He claimed a clash was possible because of the suddenly conflicting interests of the government and of the militant outfits active in Jammu and Kashmir even though the government had been an ardent supporter of Muslim freedom movements, particularly that of Kashmir.

Pakistan denies giving orders to LeT's activities. However, the Indian government and many non-governmental think-tanks allege that the Pakistani ISI is involved with the group. The situation with LeT causes considerable strain in Indo-Pakistani relations, which are already mired in suspicion and mutual distrust.

Role in Afghanistan
The LeT was created to participate in the Mujahideen conflict against the Najibullah regime in Afghanistan. In the process, the outfit developed deep linkages with Afghanistan and has several Afghan nationals in its cadre. The outfit had also cultivated links with the former Taliban regime in Afghanistan and also with Osama bin Laden and his al-Qaeda network. Even while refraining from openly displaying these links, the LeT office in Muridke was reportedly used as a transit camp for third country recruits heading for Afghanistan.

Guantanamo detainee Khalid Bin Abdullah Mishal Thamer Al Hameydani's Combatant Status Review Tribunal said that he had received training via Lashkar-e-Taiba.

Lashkar-e-Taiba's directed attacks against Indian targets in Afghanistan. Three major attacks occurred against Indian government employees and private workers in Afghanistan.

The Combatant Status Review Tribunals of Taj Mohammed and Rafiq Bin Bashir Bin Jalud Al Hami, and the Administrative Review Board hearing of Abdullah Mujahid and Zia Ul Shah allege that they too were members or former members of Lashkar-e-Taiba.

Links with other militant groups
While the primary focus for the Lashkar is the operations in Indian Kashmir, it has frequently provided support to other international terrorist groups. Primary among these is the al-Qaeda Network in Afghanistan. LeT members also have been reported to have engaged in conflicts in the Philippines, Bosnia, the Middle East and Chechnya. There are also allegations that members of the Liberation Tigers of Tamil Eelam conducted arms transfers and made deals with LeT in the early 1990s.

Al-Qaeda
 The Lashkar is claimed to have operated a military camp in post–11 September Afghanistan, and extending support to the ousted Taliban regime. The outfit had claimed that it had assisted the Taliban militia and Osama bin Laden's al-Qaeda network in Afghanistan during November and December 2002 in their fight against the US-aided Northern Alliance.
 A leading al-Qaeda operative Abu Zubaydah, who became operational chief of al-Qaeda after the death of Mohammed Atef, was caught in a Lashkar safehouse at Faisalabad in Pakistan.
 A news report in the aftermath of 11 September attacks in the U.S. has indicated that the outfit provides individuals for the outer circle of bin Laden's personal security.
 Other notable al-Qaeda operatives said to have received instruction and training in LeT camps include David Hicks, Richard Reid and Dhiren Barot.

Jaish-e-Mohammed
News reports, citing security forces, said that the latter suspect that on 13 December 2001 attack on India's Parliament in New Delhi, a joint group from the LeT and the Jaish-e-Mohammed (JeM) were involved. The attack precipitated the 2001–2002 India–Pakistan standoff.

Hizb-ul-Mujahideen
The Lashkar is reported to have conducted several of its major operations in tandem with the Hizb-ul-Mujahideen.They conducted various operations together and it's believed that they still work together in j&k

Ties to attacks in the United States
 The Markaz campus at Muridke in Lahore, its headquarters, was used as a hide-out for both Ramzi Yousef, involved in the 1993 World Trade Center bombing, and Mir Aimal Kansi, convicted and executed for the January 1993 killing of two Central Intelligence Agency officers outside the agency's headquarters in Langley, Virginia.
 A group of men dubbed the Virginia Jihad Network attended LeT training camps and were convicted in 2006 of conspiring to provide material support to the LeT. The leader of the group, Ali al-Timimi, urged the men to attend the LeT camps and to "go abroad to join the mujahideen engaged in jihad in Afghanistan." The men also trained with weapons in Virginia.
 Two U.S. citizens, Syed Haris Ahmed and Ehsanul Sadequee were arrested in 2006 for attempting to join LeT. Ahmed traveled to Pakistan in July 2005 to attend a terrorist training camp and join LeT. The men also shot videos of U.S. landmarks in the Washington, D.C. area for potential terrorist attacks. They were convicted in Atlanta during the summer of 2009 for conspiring to provide material support to terrorists.
 U.S. citizen Ahmad Abousamra was indicted in November 2009 for providing material support to terrorists. He allegedly went to Pakistan in 2002 to join the Taliban and LeT, but failed. The F.B.I. issued a $50,000 reward for his capture on 3 October 2012.

See also

 Ghazwa-e-Hind
 2008 Mumbai attacks
 Abdul Rauf Asghar
 Ajmal Kasab
 al Qaeda
 All Parties Hurriyat Conference
 Burhan Wani
 Kashmir conflict and Problems before Plebiscite
 Lascar
 List of designated terrorist groups
 List of organizations banned by the Government of India
 Osama bin Laden
 Afzal Guru
 Syed Ali Shah Geelani

Notes

References

Further reading

External links
 Lashkar-e Tayyiba (LeT). Rewards for Justice.
 Profile of Lashkar-e-Taiba, The Washington Post, 2008-12-05
 Profile: Lashkar-e-Taiba – BBC News
 Lashkar-e-Taibi and Pakistan (conference video), Jamestown Foundation, C-SPAN
 Report on the Lashkar-e-Toiba by the Anti-Defamation League
 Report on Lashkar-e-Toiba by the South Asia Terrorism Portal
 Should Mohd. Afzal Guru be executed? International Terrorism Monitor—Paper # 132.
 Islamist Militancy in Kashmir: The Case of the Lashkar-i Tayyeba – by Prof. Yoginder Sikand
 Background on the fidayeen tactics of Lashkar-e-Toiba
 PBS report about Jamat-ud-Dawa's relief work in Kashmir
 San Francisco Chronicle article about the Ad-Dawa relief work
 Protecting the Homeland Against Mumbai-Style Attacks and the Threat from Lashkar-E-Taiba: Hearing before the Subcommittee on Counterterrorism and Intelligence of the Committee on Homeland Security, House of Representatives, One Hundred Thirteenth Congress, First Session, 12 June 2013

 
1987 establishments in Afghanistan
1987 establishments in Pakistan
Ahl-i Hadith
Far-right politics in Pakistan
Groups affiliated with al-Qaeda
Jihadist groups in Afghanistan
Jihadist groups in India
Jihadist groups in Jammu and Kashmir
Jihadist groups in Pakistan
Jihadist groups
Organisations designated as terrorist by Australia
Organisations designated as terrorist by India
Organisations designated as terrorist by the United Kingdom
Organizations designated as terrorist by Canada
Organizations designated as terrorist by Russia
Organizations designated as terrorist by the United States
Organizations based in Asia designated as terrorist
Organizations established in 1987
Supraorganizations
Violence against Hindus in India
Organisations designated as terrorist by Pakistan
Organisations designated as terrorist by Japan
Hafiz Muhammad Saeed